Vânători is a commune in Iași County, Western Moldavia, Romania. It is composed of five villages: Crivești, Gura Bâdiliței, Hârtoape, Vânători and Vlădnicuț.

References 

Communes in Iași County
Localities in Western Moldavia